John Cecil Dodsworth (17 September 1910 – 11 September 1964) was an English actor.

Biography and Career
Born John Cecil Dodsworth in London, England. Dodsworth started his film career as an extra in British films of the 1930s before taking on supporting roles in movies such as The Next of Kin (1942), They Were Sisters  and The Rake's Progress (both 1945). He had larger roles in his next two films, as the romantic lead in the Bud Flanagan and Chesney Allen comedy Here Comes the Sun (1946), and Who Killed Van Loon? (1948), an early film from Hammer Film Productions.

Like a lot of British actors of the period he moved to America in the 1950s, making his Hollywood film debut in Up Front (1951). A number of small uncredited roles followed in classic films such as Singin' in the Rain (1952), Les Misérables (1952) and Lust for Life (1956). Interspersed with these small parts were more prominent roles in films such as Bwana Devil (1952), Rogue's March (1953) and The Maze (1953). He also appeared in tv shows such as Jungle Jim, Alfred Hitchcock Presents, Maverick and 77 Sunset Strip.

He married film production secretary Donna Hedyt in 1961. Dodsworth committed suicide in 1964 at the age of 53.

Filmography

External links

1910 births
1964 deaths
Male actors from London
1964 suicides
Suicides in California